Shahran (also Romanized as Shahrān; also known as Shārān and Shiaran) is a village in Rahmatabad Rural District, Rahmatabad and Blukat District, Rudbar County, Gilan Province, Iran. At the 2006 census, its population was 330, in 93 families.

References 

Populated places in Rudbar County